José Sahuquillo (born 9 January 1939) is a Spanish rower. He competed in the men's coxed pair event at the 1960 Summer Olympics.

References

1939 births
Living people
Spanish male rowers
Olympic rowers of Spain
Rowers at the 1960 Summer Olympics
People from Mérida, Spain
Sportspeople from the Province of Badajoz